Malta MedAir is a European-based airline registered in Malta and flies under a Maltese AOC.

Fleet
A320 3
Two operate for Medsky Airways 9H-MSA in operation 9H-MSB stored in Malta 9H-MMO operating flights for Malta Medair

Others 
Member of the Association of European Regional Airlines (ERA).

References

Airlines of Malta
Association of European Airlines members
Airlines established in 2018
2018 establishments in Malta